The Burmese bamboo shark, Chiloscyllium burmensis, is an extremely rare bamboo shark in the family Hemiscylliidae. The first specimen was caught 1963 off the coast from Rangoon in Burma in a depth of 29 – 33 m. This holotype is an adult male, 57 cm long and kept in the National Museum of Natural History, Smithsonian Institution, Washington DC. Later, three more specimens, two males and one female, were recorded 2018 from the Bangladesh Fisheries Development Corporation Fish Landing Center of Cox’s Bazar.

Description 
The dorsal fin of the Burmese bamboo shark has straight rear margins. They are relatively small in size and have a slender body, blunt snout, and small eyes.  It has no particular color pattern.

Diet 
They eat small bony fish or invertebrates.

Reproduction 
It is presumed to be oviparous (egg laying).

See also

List of sharks

References

 
 Compagno, Dando, & Fowler, Sharks of the World, Princeton University Press, New Jersey 2005 

Burmese bamboo shark
Fish of Myanmar
Endemic fauna of Myanmar
Burmese bamboo shark